A pathovar is a bacterial strain or set of strains with the same or similar characteristics, that is differentiated at infrasubspecific level from other strains of the same species or subspecies on the basis of distinctive pathogenicity to one or more plant hosts.

Pathovars are named as a ternary or quaternary addition to the species binomial name, for example the bacterium that causes citrus canker Xanthomonas axonopodis, has several pathovars with different host ranges,  X. axonopodis pv. citri is one of them; the abbreviation 'pv.' means pathovar.

The type strains of pathovars are pathotypes, which are distinguished from the types (holotype, neotype, etc.) of the species to which the pathovar belongs.

See also 
 Infraspecific names in botany
 Phytopathology
 Trinomen, infraspecific names in zoology (subspecies only)

References 

Biological classification
Bacterial plant pathogens and diseases
Microbiology
Pathovars